Digital terrestrial television in Bulgaria began on November, 2004 in Sofia, Bulgaria with the launch of a free-to-air platform. Ever since then the Digital terrestrial tv network has grown to have networks all over Bulgaria.

History 
Bulgaria launched a free-to-air platform on Sofia region, starting in November 2004. The Communications Regulatory Commission (CRC) has said that it received 6 bids for the licence to build and operate Bulgaria's two nationwide DTT networks. A second licence tender for the operation of 3 DTT multiplexes was open until 27 May 2009. Following the closing of this process, Hannu Pro, part of Silicon Group, and with Baltic Operations has secured the license to operate three DTT multiplexes in Bulgaria by the country's Communications Regulatory Commission (CRC) Bulgaria completed the transition to digital broadcasting in September 2013.

Simulcast 
First regular digital broadcast started on 1 March 2013. Analog broadcasting will be definitely terminated at 1 September 2013.
The Simulcast period (time between digital broadcast switch-on and analog broadcast switch-off) will allow people time to buy new integrated Digital TVs or set-top boxes. On 30 September 2013 the simulcast period was officially put to an end.

Technical information 
Standards chosen are DVB-T and MPEG4 AVC/H.264 compression format. DVB-T2 will not be used for now.

SFN Allotments in Bulgaria 

Bulgaria
Bulgaria